Karmei Katif is a communal settlement in southern Israel. Located close to the Green Line of the southern West Bank, it falls under the jurisdiction of Lakhish Regional Council.

History
The village was established in 2016 by former residents of the Katif settlement who had left the Gaza Strip as a result of the disengagement plan. Between the disengagement and the building of the new village, the founders lived in the moshav of Amatzia directly to the south of Karmei Katif. The village was built on the ruins of the Palestinian village of al-Dawayima, which had dozens of civilian casualties during the 1948 Arab–Israeli War.

References 

Community settlements
Populated places established in 2016
2016 establishments in Israel
Populated places in Southern District (Israel)